Pedro Paulo Pinheiro Neves (born 6 October 1981) is a Portuguese former footballer who is last known to have played as a defender or midfielder for Moncarapachense.

Career

As a youth player, Neves joined the youth academy of Sporting, one of Portugal's most successful clubs.

He started his career with Alverca in the Portuguese top flight.

In 2006, Neves signed for Swiss fourth division side La Tour/Le Pâquier from Peniche in the Portuguese third division.

In 2008, he signed for Albanian team Bylis.

In 2016, he signed for Moncarapachense in the Portuguese fourth division.

References

External links

 

Portuguese footballers
Living people
Expatriate footballers in Albania
Portuguese expatriate footballers
Kategoria Superiore players
Association football defenders
S.C. Praiense players
Association football midfielders
1981 births
Expatriate footballers in Switzerland
Portuguese expatriate sportspeople in Switzerland
F.C. Alverca players
G.D. Peniche players
Campeonato de Portugal (league) players
Primeira Liga players
Liga Portugal 2 players
KF Bylis players
C.D. Pinhalnovense players
Odivelas F.C. players
S.C.U. Torreense players
Lusitano F.C. (Portugal) players